The Leningrad Cowboys are a Finnish rock band who perform rock and roll covers of other songs. They have exaggerated pompadour hairstyles and wear long, pointy shoes.  They often work with the Russian military band the Alexandrov Ensemble.

Beginnings
The band was an invention of the Finnish film director Aki Kaurismäki together with Sakke Järvenpää and Mato Valtonen, members of the Finnish comedy rock band Sleepy Sleepers. The three of them conceived the band in a bar in 1986 as a joke on the waning power of the Soviet Union. The two musicians expressed their wishes that Kaurismäki would direct their first music video, which resulted in the short film Rocky VI (1986). After two further short films, "Thru the Wire" (1987) and "L.A. Woman" (1988), Kaurismäki decided to direct a feature film about them, Leningrad Cowboys Go America (1989).

After Leningrad Cowboys Go America
The band appeared in two subsequent music videos: Those Were the Days (1992) and These Boots (1993), as well as a concert film The Total Balalaika Show (1994) all directed by Kaurismäki.

In 1994, Kaurismäki directed a sequel to Leningrad Cowboys Go America entitled Leningrad Cowboys Meet Moses.

December 2012 saw the release of an animated Christmas video featuring Dog'Y'Dog, a dog resembling the dog from the "You're My Heart, You're My Soul" video.  The video also featured a cover of "Christmas in Hollis" from an upcoming Leningrad Cowboys album for Christmas 2013.

Red X-Mas was a tour of Finland by the Leningrad Cowboys and the Russian Air Force Choir from 27 November to 7 December 2013, featuring over 60 performers.

In co-production with Anima Vitae, Leningrad cowboys is producing an animated feature Dog'y'dog featuring the half-Siberian/half-Mexican dog (from their "Christmas in Hollis" music video) traveling from Siberia to Mexico via the US.

Dog'y'Dog also appeared in the Bonehead game for Android developed by Leningrad Cowboys Studios and Fingersoft and released 13 May 2014.

Band members
Current members
 Ville Tuomi: lead vocals (2011–)
 Sakke Järvenpää: vocals (1986–)
 Varre Vartiainen: guitar (2003–)
 Pauli Hauta-aho: guitar (2011–)
 Timo Tolonen: bass (2003–)
 Sami Järvinen: drums (2011–)
 Okke Komulainen: keyboards, accordion (2011–)
 Tume Uusitalo: vocals, guitar (2003–)
 Pemo Ojala: trumpet, Mitten (1991–)
 Pope Puolitaival: saxophone (2003–)
 Jay Kortehisto: trombone (2003–)
 Anna Sainila: dancer, vocals (2011–)
 Hanna Moisala: dancer, vocals (2011–)

Discography

 1917–1987 (1987)
 Leningrad Cowboys Go America (1989)
 We Cum From Brooklyn (1992)
 Happy Together (1994)
 Go Space (1996)
 Mongolian Barbeque (1997)
 Terzo Mondo (2000)
 Zombies Paradise (2006)
 Buena Vodka Social Club (2011)
 Merry Christmas (2013)

References

External links

 

1986 establishments in Finland
Finnish hard rock musical groups
Finnish heavy metal musical groups
Musical groups established in 1986